Red Balloon or Red Balloons may refer to:

Film
The Red Balloon, a 1956 French short film
Flight of the Red Balloon, a 2007 film based on the 1956 short film
Red Balloon (2010 film), a 2010 thriller short film directed by Alexis Wajsbrot and Damien Mace

Music
"99 Luftballons" (an English version of which is called "99 Red Balloons"), a song by Nena
 "Red Balloon", a song by Tim Hardin
 Red Balloon, an album by Sandra McCracken
 "Red Balloon", a song by Charli XCX, from the album Sucker
 "The Red Balloon" (song)", a song by the Dave Clark Five

Other uses
 The 2009 DARPA Network Challenge (also known as the Red Balloon Challenge), involving spotting 10 red balloons in the Continental United States.
 Red Balloon, a 1922 painting by Paul Klee
 Red Balloon Learner Centres, an educational charity
 Red Balloon a First Capital Connect train named after the Red Balloon Learner Centres
 RedBalloon, an online experience gift retailer based in Australia.